Theatre of Australia refers to the history of the performing arts in Australia, or produced by Australians. There are theatrical and dramatic aspects to a number of Indigenous Australian ceremonies such as the corroboree. During its colonial period, Australian theatrical arts were generally linked to the broader traditions of English literature and to British and Irish theatre. Australian literature and theatrical artists (including Aboriginal as well as Anglo-Celtic and multicultural migrant Australians) have over the last two centuries introduced the culture of Australia and the character of a new continent to the world stage.

Individuals who have contributed to theatre in Australia and internationally include Sir Robert Helpmann, Dame Joan Sutherland, Barry Humphries, David Williamson, Cate Blanchett, Geoffrey Rush, Judy Davis, Jim Sharman, Tim Minchin and Baz Luhrmann. Notable theatrical institutions include the Sydney Opera House, and the National Institute of Dramatic Art in Sydney.

History

Early history

The traditional ceremonial dances of indigenous Australians performed at corroborees comprise theatrical aspects. At a corroboree Aborigines interact with the Dreamtime through dance, music and costume and many ceremonies act out events from the Dreamtime. Corroboree in many areas have developed and adapted, integrating new themes and stories since European occupation of Australia began. Academic Maryrose Casey writes that ‘Australian Aboriginal cultures are probably the most performance-based in the world – in the sense that explicit, choreographed performances were used for a vast range of social purposes from education, through to spiritual practices, arranging marriage alliances, to judicial and diplomatic functions’. Casey suggests that 'corroboree' could also be called 'aboriginal theatre'.

European theatrical traditions came to Australia with European settlement commencing in 1788 with the First Fleet. The first production, The Recruiting Officer written by George Farquhar in 1706, was performed in 1789 by convicts. The extraordinary circumstances of the foundation of Australian theatre was recounted in the 1988 play Our Country's Good by Timberlake Wertenbaker - the participants were prisoners watched by sadistic guards and the leading lady was under threat of the death penalty. The play is based on Thomas Keneally's novel The Playmaker.

The Theatre Royal, Hobart opened in 1837 and is the oldest still-operating theatre in Australia. Noël Coward called it a Dream Theatre and Laurence Olivier came to its defence when it was threatened with demolition in the 1940s. The Queen's Theatre, Adelaide opened with Shakespeare in 1841 and is today the oldest theatre on the mainland. The Melbourne Athenaeum was founded in 1839 as the Melbourne Mechanics' Institute, and its theatre in its present form was created in 1921.

The Australian gold rushes beginning in the 1850s provided funds for the construction of grand theatres in the Victorian style. A theatre was built on the present site of Melbourne's Princess Theatre in 1854.

Playwrights active early in Australia include Arthur Adams, Musette Morrell, Malcolm Afford, Walter J Turner, CHarles Haddon Chambers and Louis Esson. Musicals were written by Alfred Wheeler, Arlene Sauer, Edmund Duggan . Opera were composed by Moritz Heuzenroeder, Arthur Chanter.

Post-federation

After federation in 1901, theatre productions embodied the sense of national identity that had tormented in Australian literature since the 1890s. On Our Selection (1912) by Steele Rudd told of the adventures of a pioneer farming family and became popular and was adopted to film. Other examples include The Bunyip (musical), F.F.F. and 1918 pantomime version of Robinson Crusoe on Rainbow Island with music by six Australian composers.

His Majesty's Theatre, Perth opened in 1904. The building remains a rare example of Edwardian theatrical architecture in Australia. Sydney's grand Capitol Theatre opened in 1928 and after restoration remains one of the nation's finest auditoriums. The State Theatre (renamed the Forum in 1963) and the Regent Theatre both opened in Melbourne in 1929, originally as cinemas.

During the 1940s, John Antill composed the music for his Corroboree ballet based on the Aboriginal corroboree. The production was first performed in 1946 and toured Australia during the 1950s and featured on the schedule of Queen Elizabeth II's first Royal Tour of Australia in 1954. It represents an early example of the fusion of Western and Aboriginal theatrical forms in Australia – now regularly expressed, as seen in the work of the Bangarra Dance Theatre.

In early 1955, the Union Theatre Repertory Company invited a young Barry Humphries to tour Victoria with a production of Twelfth Night directed by Ray Lawler. On tour, Humphries gradually invented the character of Edna Everage as part of the entertainment for the actors during commutes between country towns, imitating the Country Women's Association representatives who welcomed the troupe in each town. By night Lawler worked on a new play, Summer of the Seventeenth Doll, his tenth but most acclaimed work. Both creations represented historic milestones in Australian theatre. Summer of the Seventeenth Doll was the first Australian play produced by the MTC and portrayed resolutely Australian characters and went on to international acclaim.
At Lawler's suggestion, Mrs Everage made her first appearance in a Melbourne University's UTRC revue at the end of 1955, as the city prepared for the 1956 Summer Olympic Games. The sketch involved a houseproud "average housewife" offering her Moonee Ponds home as an Olympic billet. Humphries left for London in his early 20s and enjoyed success on stage, including in Lionel Bart's musical, Oliver!. His satirical stage creations – notably Dame Edna and later Les Patterson – became Australian cultural icons. Humphries also achieved success in the US with tours on Broadway and television appearances and has remained a stalwart of British and Australian theatre and been honoured in both nations.

Growth of non-commercial theatre
The Melbourne Theatre Company, originally the Union Theatre Repertory Company, formed in 1953, is Australia's oldest professional theatre company. Over the years, MTC has championed Australian writing, introducing the works of writers such as Alan Seymour, Vance Palmer, Patrick White, Alan Hopgood, Alexander Buzo, David Williamson, John Romeril, Jim McNeil, Alma De Groen, John Powers, Matt Cameron, Ron Elisha, Justin Fleming, Janis Bolodis, Hannie Rayson, Louis Nowra, Michael Gurr, Jack Davis, Michael Gow and Joanna Murray-Smith and many others to mainstream Melbourne audiences. In The One Day of the Year Alan Seymour studied the paradoxical nature of the ANZAC Day commemoration by Australians of the defeat of the Battle of Gallipoli.

The National Institute of Dramatic Art was established in Sydney in 1958. This institute has since produced a list of famous alumni including Cate Blanchett, Toni Collette, Mel Gibson and Baz Luhrmann.

The Australian Ballet was founded by the English ballerina Dame Peggy van Praagh in 1962. It is Australia's foremost classical ballet company and is today recognised as one of the world's major international ballet companies. It is based in Melbourne and performs works from the classical repertoire as well as contemporary works by major Australian and international choreographers. As of 2010, it was presenting approximately 200 performances in cities and regional areas around Australia each year as well as international tours. Regular venues include: the Arts Centre Melbourne, Sydney Opera House, Sydney Theatre, Adelaide Festival Centre and Queensland Performing Arts Centre.

From the 1960s, major cities across Australia developed new government-owned performing arts centres, often housing not-for-profit theatre, opera and dance companies.  Examples include the Canberra Theatre Centre, the Sydney Opera House, Arts Centre Melbourne, the Adelaide Festival Centre and the Queensland Performing Arts Centre in Brisbane.  Most major regional centres and many outer metropolitan areas have a professional-standard performing arts centre typically run by the local council, either newly built such as the Riverside Theatres Parramatta, Wagga Wagga Civic Theatre or the Frankston Arts Centre, or a refurbishment of a heritage theatre or cinema such as the Newcastle Civic Theatre, the Theatre Royal, Hobart or the Empire Theatre, Toowoomba.

With the completion of the Adelaide Festival Centre in 1973, Sir Robert Helpmann became director of the Adelaide Festival of Arts.

The new wave of Australian theatre debuted in the 1970s with the works of writers including David Williamson, Barry Oakley and Jack Hibberd. The Belvoir St Theatre established by John Bell and Richard Wherrett originated in Sydney around 1970 and presented works by Nick Enright and David Williamson.

The Sydney Theatre Company was founded in 1978 becoming one of Australia's foremost theatre companies. Players associated with the company include Mel Gibson, Judy Davis, Hugo Weaving, Geoffrey Rush and Toni Collette. It operates from The Wharf Theatre near The Rocks, as well as the Sydney Theatre and the Sydney Opera House Drama Theatre.

In 1979, two impoverished young Sydney actors, Mel Gibson and Geoffrey Rush, shared a flat and co-starred in a local production of Waiting for Godot. Gibson had studied at NIDA and made his stage debut alongside classmate Judy Davis in a 1976 production of Romeo and Juliet. The 1979 Australian film Mad Max carried Gibson to the beginnings of a global film career. Rush joined Jim Sharman's Lighthouse Theatre troupe in the 1980s and built a reputation as one of Australia's leading stage actors before becoming known internationally in film.

Arts Centre Melbourne in the Melbourne Arts Precinct was designed by architect Sir Roy Grounds, the masterplan for the complex was approved in 1960, and construction of the Arts Centre began in 1973. The complex opened in stages, with Hamer Hall opening in 1982, and the Theatres Building opening in 1984. The centre now hosts regular performances by Opera Australia, The Australian Ballet, the Melbourne Theatre Company and Melbourne Symphony Orchestra as well as a large number of Australian and international performances and production companies.

The Belvoir St Theatre was established by John Bell and Richard Wherrett in Sydney around 1970. Construction of the Adelaide Festival Centre was completed in 1973. In the same year, the Sydney Opera House was inaugurated in Sydney – becoming among the most famous theatre buildings in the world.

The Bell Shakespeare Company was created in 1990 by John Bell. The company specialises in the works of William Shakespeare. It is Australia's only national touring theatre company touring each Australian state in each year. A period of success for Australian musical theatre came in the 1990s with the debut of musical biographies of Australian music singers Peter Allen (The Boy From Oz in 1998) and Johnny O'Keefe (Shout! The Legend of The Wild One).

Ngapartji Ngapartji, by Scott Rankin and Trevor Jamieson, recounts the story of the effects on the Pitjantjatjara people of nuclear testing in the Western Desert during the Cold War. It is an example of the contemporary fusion of traditions of drama in Australia with Pitjantjatjara actors being supported by a multicultural cast of Greek, Afghan, Japanese and New Zealand heritage.

Eminent contemporary Australian playwrights include David Williamson, Alan Seymour, the late Nick Enright and Justin Fleming.

Theatre today
Theatre in Australia today includes a diverse range of performances of different scale and contexts.

Commercial theatres like the Lyric, Capitol and Theatre Royal in Sydney and the Regent, Princess, Her Majesty's and Comedy in Melbourne, and other major venues in these and other cities, host Australian productions of popular musicals and other large-scale events. Resident professional theatre companies in Sydney (Sydney Theatre Company, Belvoir, Griffin, Ensemble), Melbourne (Melbourne Theatre Company, Malthouse), Brisbane (Queensland Theatre, La Boite), Perth (Black Swan), Adelaide (State Theatre Company of South Australia), and some other cities on a smaller-scale, produce mainstage seasons of Australian and international plays and, occasionally, musicals.

Some professional companies focus on particular genres like classical theatre (Bell Shakespeare), theatre for young people (Windmill, Barking Gecko, Patch, Arena, Monkey Baa), music theatre (The Production Company, Harvest Rain) or circus and physical theatre (Circa, Circus Oz). Other companies specialise in areas such as artists with disability (Back to Back), Indigenous artists (see below) or specific communities (Urban Theatre Projects, Big hART).

Performing arts centres across the country like the Sydney Opera House, Arts Centre Melbourne, Queensland Performing Arts Centre, Adelaide Festival Centre produce, present or host Australian and international theatre productions of various kinds. Venues in smaller cities like the Theatre Royal Hobart, The Arts Centre Gold Coast, Darwin Entertainment Centre or Geelong Performing Arts Centre, or outside the CBD of major cities like Frankston Arts Centre, Riverside Theatre Parramatta or Sunnybank Performing Arts Centre, also present seasons of touring productions. Non-traditional spaces Carriageworks in Sydney and Arts House in Melbourne have a focus on contemporary and experimental works. Independent and fringe theatre is fostered by venues such as La Mama and Theatre Works in Melbourne and the Old Fitz in Sydney.

Opera companies include Opera Australia which performs major seasons in Sydney and Melbourne, and West Australian Opera, Opera Queensland, State Opera of South Australia and Victorian Opera based in individual states. Sydney's Pinchgut Opera, for baroque and early classical works, and Sydney Chamber Opera, for twentieth century and contemporary works, perform opera in chamber settings.

The national Helpmann Awards are the major live performance awards in Australia. Major cities also have their own theatre awards, such as the Sydney Theatre Awards, Melbourne's Green Room Awards and Brisbane's Matilda Awards.

Publishers of Australian playscripts include the non-profit Australian Script Centre, Currency Press, Playlab Press and Full Dress Publishing.

Indigenous theatre

In the late 1960s and early 1970s, street theatre, guerrilla theatre and other performances put on by the Aboriginal community were used as a form of political protest. Brian Syron, actor, director and teacher, was a pioneer of Aboriginal theatre from the 1960s onwards. Melbourne's Nindethana Theatre was Australia's first Aboriginal theatre company, co-founded by Bob Maza and Uncle Jack Charles in 1971. Maza also helped set up National Black Theatre in Redfern, Sydney, in 1972. Playwrights such as Kevin Gilbert, Jack Davis and Kath Oodgeroo Noonuccal Walker wrote works which were by, about and for Aboriginal people, and Harry and Bindi Williams, Gary Foley and Paul Coe added to the content and drive which helped "Blak" theatre production. Rhoda Roberts and Justine Saunders were two other driving forces, for example in the creation of the Aboriginal National Theatre Trust. 

 there are several Indigenous theatre companies in existence, such as Yirra Yaakin in Perth, Ilbijerri in Melbourne (led by Bob Maza's daughter, Rachael), and Moogahlin Performing Arts, based in Sydney's Carriageworks. The Bangarra Dance Theatre is known worldwide, BlakDance is another pathway for Indigenous dancers, and Marrugeku, "Australia's Leading Indigenous Intercultural Dance Theatre", has bases on both Sydney Carriageworks and in Broome, Western Australia. The Aboriginal Centre for the Performing Arts in Brisbane provides a pathway for young Indigenous performers. Writer/performers such as Nakkiah Lui, Leah Purcell and others continue to produce work for stage.

Theatre companies

Plays and theatre
Back to Back Theatre
Bell Shakespeare Company
Black Swan Theatre Company
Brink Productions
Belvoir, Sydney 
Griffin Theatre Company
La Boite Theatre
La Mama Theatre, Melbourne
Malthouse Theatre
Melbourne Theatre Company
Queensland Theatre 
State Theatre Company of South Australia
Sydney Theatre Company
Twelfth Night Theatre
Tropic Sun Theatre Company
Windmill Performing Arts

Musical theatre
Chamber Made
Hayes Theatre Co
Harvest Rain Theatre Company

Circus and physical theatre
Circa, Brisbane
Circus Oz
Kage Physical Theatre
Legs On The Wall
Gravity and Other Myths

Opera companies
Opera Australia
Opera Queensland
State Opera of South Australia
Victorian Opera
West Australian Opera

Performing arts festivals

Major performing arts festivals 
 Adelaide Festival of Arts
 Brisbane Festival
 Melbourne Festival
 Perth International Arts Festival
 Sydney Festival
 Ten Days on the Island (Tasmania)

Single genre 
 Adelaide Cabaret Festival
 Melbourne International Comedy Festival

Fringe festivals 
Adelaide Fringe
 Melbourne Fringe Festival
 Fringe World (Perth)

Theatre education

Aboriginal Centre for the Performing Arts 
Australian Institute of Music - Dramatic Arts
National Institute of Dramatic Art (NIDA) 
Western Australian Academy of Performing Arts (WAAPA)
Victorian College of the Arts (VCA)
National Institute of Circus Arts (NICA)
Adelaide College of the Arts
Australian Institute of Music
CQUniversity's Central Queensland Conservatorium of Music, Mackay

Awards and competitions
Green Room Awards - for Melbourne theatre, opera and dance
Helpmann Award - national awards for plays, musicals, opera, dance, comedy, cabaret, contemporary music and classical music
Mo Awards
Matilda Awards - for Brisbane theatre
Performing Arts WA Awards - for Perth theatre, musicals, opera and dance
Sydney Theatre Awards - for Sydney theatre

Performing arts publishers
Australian Script Centre
Currency Press

See also
Australian Elizabethan Theatre Trust
AusStage - Gateway to Performing Arts
Australian comedy

References

External links
AustralianPlays.org - source of Australian playscripts
The History of Theatre in Australia
AussieTheatre.com - Australia theatre news site
Highlights in Australian theatre history at the Australian Culture and Recreation Portal
RealTime - Australian contemporary arts magazine covering dance, performance, sound/music, visual arts, film and media art
AusStage, Australian Performing Arts Database, Flinders University, SA
AusStage, theatre productions, Australian National Identity 1829 - 2012. -database, Flinders University, SA